Hubal is a Polish historical film directed by . It was released in 1973.

History 
According to the director's recollections, at the beginning of the 1970s, he was summoned to the Ministry of Culture, where he was presented with a ready-made script by Jan Józef Szczepański, at the same time offering to make a film. Bohdan Poręba accepted the offer, but he forced the removal of a few scenes (the commander's romance with a peasant woman and the execution of German prisoners of war). The finished film did not avoid censorship problems – the intention was to cut out a scene from the morning mass on Christmas, during which the hymn Boże, coś Polskę is chanted. The director avoided it thanks to the opinion of the Minister of National Defense, General Wojciech Jaruzelski, who succinctly praised the film after an improvised screening. The film has no scriptwriter in the lead, because Jan Józef Szczepański withdrew after the changes introduced by the director.

Plot
Legendary Hubal – major Henryk Dobrzański, in spite of Nazi occupation in 1939 does not surrender and still fights with the enemy with a group of his faithful soldiers.

Cast
Ryszard Filipski as major Henryk Dobrzański "Hubal"
Małgorzata Potocka as  "Tereska"
Tadeusz Janczar as captain Maciej Kalenkiewicz "Kotwicz"
Emil Karewicz as rittmeister Stanisław Sołtykiewicz
Andrzej Kozak as Maruszewski
Zygmunt Malanowicz as priest Ludwik Mucha
Stanisław Niwiński
Józef Nowak as colonel Leopold Okulicki "Miller"
Tadeusz Schmidt
Kazimierz Wichniarz as priest Edward Ptaszyński
Jerzy Aleksander Braszka
Henryk Giżycki
Bolesław Idziak
Jerzy Korsztyn

References

External links

1973 films
Polish historical films
1970s Polish-language films
World War II films based on actual events
1970s historical films
Films about Polish resistance during World War II
Polish war films